The 154th Regiment Illinois Volunteer Infantry was an infantry regiment that served in the Union Army during the American Civil War.

Service
The 154th Illinois Infantry was organized at Camp Butler, Illinois,    and mustered into Federal service on February 21, 1865, for a one-year enlistment.  The 154th served in garrisons in Tennessee.

The regiment mustered out September 18, 1865.

Total strength and casualties 
The regiment suffered 76 enlisted men who died of disease for a total of 76 fatalities.

Commanders
Colonel Mclain F. Wood - died August 6, 1865.
Lieutenant Colonel Francis Swanwick - mustered out with the regiment.

See also
List of Illinois Civil War Units
Illinois in the American Civil War

Notes

References
The Civil War Archive

Units and formations of the Union Army from Illinois
Military units and formations established in 1865
1865 establishments in Illinois
Military units and formations disestablished in 1865